Li Nina (born January 10, 1983, in Benxi, Liaoning) is a Chinese aerial skier who won silver at both the 2006 and 2010 Winter Olympics.  She placed 5th at the 2002 Winter Olympics, and has won three World Championships in aerials.

External links
 FIS-Ski.com Biography/Results

1983 births
Living people
Freestyle skiers at the 2002 Winter Olympics
Freestyle skiers at the 2006 Winter Olympics
Freestyle skiers at the 2010 Winter Olympics
Freestyle skiers at the 2014 Winter Olympics
People from Benxi
Olympic silver medalists for China
Olympic freestyle skiers of China
Chinese female freestyle skiers
Olympic medalists in freestyle skiing
Skiers from Liaoning
Medalists at the 2010 Winter Olympics
Medalists at the 2006 Winter Olympics
Asian Games medalists in freestyle skiing
Freestyle skiers at the 2007 Asian Winter Games
Universiade medalists in freestyle skiing
Asian Games gold medalists for China
Medalists at the 2007 Asian Winter Games
Universiade gold medalists for China
Competitors at the 2009 Winter Universiade